Port Sullivan, Texas is a ghost town in Milam County, Texas. It was established in 1835 by Augustus W. Sullivan. By the 1850s, Joseph P. Sneed, a pastor of the Methodist Episcopal Church, South, founded the Port Sullivan Male and Female Institute (also known as the Port Sullivan College). The town is home to the Port Sullivan Cemetery.

References

Ghost towns in Milam County, Texas
1835 establishments in Texas